Joseph B. Beidler (November 15, 1918 – October 31, 2016) was a minor league baseball player and collegiate American football and baseball coach.
He served as the head football coach at Whitman College in Walla Walla, Washington from 1951 to 1954. Prior to arriving at Whitman, Beidler served as an assistant football coach at his alma mater, Trinity College in Hartford, Connecticut from 1946 to 1948.

Head coaching record

Football

References

External links

1918 births
2016 deaths
Baseball shortstops
Hartford Bees players
Hartford Chiefs players
Trinity Bantams football coaches
Trinity Bantams football players
Whitman Blues baseball coaches
Whitman Fighting Missionaries football coaches